The First United Methodist Church, formerly the Methodist Episcopal Church, South, is a historic church at 100 North 2nd Street in Dardanelle, Arkansas.  It is a -story brick building, constructed in 1891 and extensively altered into its present Prairie School appearance in 1917.  The congregation was organized in 1848, and first met in a schoolhouse prior to the construction of its first sanctuary in 1858.

The building was listed on the National Register of Historic Places in 1996.

See also
National Register of Historic Places listings in Yell County, Arkansas

References

External links
First United Methodist Church of Dardanelle web site

Methodist churches in Arkansas
Churches on the National Register of Historic Places in Arkansas
Prairie School architecture in Arkansas
Churches completed in 1917
Churches in Yell County, Arkansas
National Register of Historic Places in Yell County, Arkansas
1917 establishments in Arkansas
Dardanelle, Arkansas